Jason Ball (born 21 November 1972) is a former Australian rules football player with the West Coast Eagles and Sydney Swans in the Australian Football League (AFL). 

The ruckman made his AFL debut for West Coast in 1992, and went on to play 103 games for them, scoring 114 goals, being part of the 1994 premiership side and winning the 1995 leading goal-kicker award. He was traded to Sydney after the 1999 season and went on to play 90 games for them. During the 2005 finals series, he announced he would retire at the end of the season. Sydney then reached the grand final, and Ball ended his career on a high note, winning his second premiership, against his former club.

Statistics

|- style="background-color: #EAEAEA"
! scope="row" style="text-align:center" | 1992
|
| 29 || 1 || 0 || 1 || 3 || 0 || 3 || 2 || 3 || 4 || 0.0 || 1.0 || 3.0 || 0.0 || 3.0 || 2.0 || 3.0 || 4.0
|-
! scope="row" style="text-align:center" | 1993
|
| 29 || 1 || 0 || 0 || 2 || 2 || 4 || 1 || 0 || 2 || 0.0 || 0.0 || 2.0 || 2.0 || 4.0 || 1.0 || 0.0 || 2.0
|- style="background-color: #EAEAEA"
|style="text-align:center;background:#afe6ba;"|1994†
|
| 26 || 16 || 10 || 8 || 131 || 75 || 206 || 63 || 15 || 58 || 0.6 || 0.5 || 8.2 || 4.7 || 12.9 || 3.9 || 0.9 || 3.6
|-
! scope="row" style="text-align:center" | 1995
|
| 26 || 22 || 48 || 35 || 208 || 87 || 295 || 128 || 14 || 38 || 2.2 || 1.6 || 9.5 || 4.0 || 13.4 || 5.8 || 0.6 || 1.7
|- style="background-color: #EAEAEA"
! scope="row" style="text-align:center" | 1996
|
| 26 || 13 || 25 || 13 || 110 || 53 || 163 || 66 || 9 || 35 || 1.9 || 1.0 || 8.5 || 4.1 || 12.5 || 5.1 || 0.7 || 2.7
|-
! scope="row" style="text-align:center" | 1997
|
| 26 || 14 || 7 || 6 || 87 || 81 || 168 || 58 || 21 || 55 || 0.5 || 0.4 || 6.2 || 5.8 || 12.0 || 4.1 || 1.5 || 3.9
|- style="background-color: #EAEAEA"
! scope="row" style="text-align:center" | 1998
|
| 26 || 20 || 20 || 11 || 178 || 109 || 287 || 89 || 13 || 218 || 1.0 || 0.6 || 8.9 || 5.5 || 14.4 || 4.5 || 0.7 || 10.9
|-
! scope="row" style="text-align:center" | 1999
|
| 26 || 16 || 4 || 4 || 100 || 75 || 175 || 65 || 7 || 135 || 0.3 || 0.3 || 6.3 || 4.7 || 10.9 || 4.1 || 0.4 || 8.4
|- style="background-color: #EAEAEA"
! scope="row" style="text-align:center" | 2000
|
| 27 || 9 || 9 || 7 || 47 || 22 || 69 || 25 || 8 || 21 || 1.0 || 0.8 || 5.2 || 2.4 || 7.7 || 2.8 || 0.9 || 2.3
|-
! scope="row" style="text-align:center" | 2001
|
| 27 || 20 || 24 || 8 || 198 || 125 || 323 || 101 || 22 || 193 || 1.2 || 0.4 || 9.9 || 6.3 || 16.2 || 5.1 || 1.1 || 9.7
|- style="background-color: #EAEAEA"
! scope="row" style="text-align:center" | 2002
|
| 27 || 0 || — || — || — || — || — || — || — || — || — || — || — || — || — || — || — || —
|-
! scope="row" style="text-align:center" | 2003
|
| 27 || 17 || 7 || 7 || 125 || 90 || 215 || 85 || 22 || 261 || 0.4 || 0.4 || 7.4 || 5.3 || 12.6 || 5.0 || 1.3 || 15.4
|- style="background-color: #EAEAEA"
! scope="row" style="text-align:center" | 2004
|
| 27 || 23 || 3 || 4 || 136 || 119 || 255 || 66 || 43 || 389 || 0.1 || 0.2 || 5.9 || 5.2 || 11.1 || 2.9 || 1.9 || 16.9
|-
|style="text-align:center;background:#afe6ba;"|2005†
|
| 27 || 21 || 2 || 2 || 107 || 77 || 184 || 73 || 25 || 285 || 0.1 || 0.1 || 5.1 || 3.7 || 8.8 || 3.5 || 1.2 || 13.6
|- class="sortbottom"
! colspan=3| Career
! 193
! 159
! 106
! 1432
! 915
! 2347
! 822
! 202
! 1694
! 0.8
! 0.5
! 7.4
! 4.7
! 12.2
! 4.3
! 1.0
! 8.8
|}

References

External links

1972 births
Living people
Swan Districts Football Club players
Sydney Swans players
Sydney Swans Premiership players
West Coast Eagles players
West Coast Eagles Premiership players
Australian rules footballers from Western Australia
Western Australian State of Origin players
Two-time VFL/AFL Premiership players